Sri Lanka's cricket tour of India in the 1986-87 season comprised a three-match Test series and a five-match ODI series. India won the Test series 2-0 as well as the ODI series 4-1

Test series

1st Test

2nd Test

3rd Test

One Day Internationals (ODIs)

India won the series 4-1.

1st ODI

2nd ODI

3rd ODI

4th ODI

5th ODI

References 

International cricket competitions from 1985–86 to 1988
1986 in Sri Lankan cricket
1986 in Indian cricket
1987 in Sri Lankan cricket
1987 in Indian cricket
Sri Lankan cricket tours of India